Bause is a German surname. Notable people with the surname include:

 Arndt Bause (1936–2003), German composer of popular songs
 Inka Bause (born 1968), German singer, TV presenter, and actress
 Johann Friedrich Bause (1738–1814), German engraver
 Margarete Bause (born 1959), German politician

German-language surnames